Taziki's Mediterranean Café is a fast casual chain of franchised restaurants based in Birmingham, Alabama that purveys Greek and Mediterranean cuisine such as gyros, sandwiches, soups, and salads.

History
The restaurant's concept was devised by Keith and Amy Richards after a 1997 vacation in Greece. The first restaurant was a café that opened in 1998 at the Cahaba Mall Shopping Center (also known as the Colonnade) in Birmingham, Alabama. In April 2014, the chain had locations in nine U.S. states; total franchise sales were $28,800,000, with average sales of $1,100,000 per store. By November 2017, there were over 90 locations across 16 states.

REAL certification
The franchise was the first in the United States to earn REAL certification from the United States Healthful Food Council (USHFC). The certification is given to restaurants that serve vegetables, fruits, and whole grains, and where the food is primarily prepared from scratch. The award recognises that the chain uses minimal processed foods, and give priority to local and organic ingredients. However, there is no way to accurately measure the REAL certification's health benefits or what it actually means to consumers.

The chain serves Gyro sandwiches made from Gyro loaf composed solely of lamb meat, rather than a mixture of lamb and beef.  Lamb meat is seen as a more sustainable choice than beef.

Philanthropy
According to a corporate spokesperson, every restaurant location supports at least one charitable organization. Nine of Taziki's locations partner with schools to offer Project Hope, styling "Hope" as an acronym for "Herbs Offering Personal Enrichment." This project provides special needs students with the opportunity to grow and package herbs that the local restaurant agrees to buy.

See also
 List of casual dining restaurant chains
 List of Greek restaurants

References

External links

Companies based in Birmingham, Alabama
Greek restaurants in the United States
1998 establishments in Alabama
Restaurants established in 1998
Fast casual restaurants
Restaurants in Alabama
Mediterranean restaurants in the United States